Diana Ross & the Supremes – 50th Anniversary: The Singles Collection 1961–1969 is a three disc box set consisting of The Supremes' original-released singles as released by Motown from 1961-1969.

Track listing

Credits
 Diana Ross – lead vocals on all tracks (except "Buttered Popcorn", backing vocals to Ballard's lead)
 Mary Wilson – vocals (Disc 1, all tracks; Disc 2, all tracks; Disc 3, tracks 1-4, 7, 9, 11, 12, 16, 17, 23, 24, 26)
 Florence Ballard – vocals (Disc 1, all tracks; Disc 2, all tracks except 18; Disc 3, tracks 2-4)
 Barbara Martin – vocals (Disc 1, tracks 1-8)
 Cindy Birdsong – vocals (Disc 3, tracks 7, 9, 11, 12, 16, 17, 23, 24, 26)
 The Temptations (Melvin Franklin, Eddie Kendricks, Paul Williams, Otis Williams, Dennis Edwards) – vocals (Disc 3, tracks 11, 12, 16, 17, 23, 24)
 Holland–Dozier–Holland (Brian Holland, Lamont Dozier, Eddie Holland) – backing vocals (Disc 1, tracks 15, 17)
 Four Tops (Levi Stubbs, Abdul "Duke" Fakir, Renaldo "Obie" Benson, Lawrence Payton) – backing vocals (Disc 1, tracks 15, 17)
 The Andantes (Jackie Hicks, Marlene Barrow, Louvain Demps) – backing vocals (Disc 3, tracks 3, 5, 8, 10, 13, 15, 18, 20, 22)
 Marlene Barrow - backing vocals (Disc 2, track 18; Disc 3, track 1)
 Maxine Waters – backing vocals (Disc 3, track 25)
 Julia Waters – backing vocals (Disc 3, track 25)
 Johnny Bristol – backing vocals (Disc 3, track 25)

Notes

Singles not included in this box set
The (pre-Supremes) Primettes released this one single, which is not included in this collection, before becoming The Supremes:
 "Tears of Sorrow" b/w
 "Pretty Baby"

Motown was to have released the following eight songs, all however becoming cancelled singles:
 "Mother Dear", first paired with "He Holds His Own", then with "Who Could Ever Doubt My Love", both of which are listed above with their replaced A-side titles.
 "Mother You, Smother You", the planned original B-side to "You Keep Me Hangin' On".
 "What the World Needs Now Is Love" b/w
 "Your Kiss of Fire"
 "The Impossible Dream", replaced by "I'm Gonna Make You Love Me" as the released A-side to "A Place in the Sun", b/w
 "A Place in the Sun", first paired as the B-side to "The Impossible Dream" before being cancelled, then paired with "I'm Gonna Make You Love Me", as listed above.
 "Stubborn Kind of Fellow" b/w
 "Try It Baby"

The following three songs were released only in the United Kingdom:
 "I Second That Emotion", as the A-side to "The Way You Do the Things You Do", which itself is listed above as part of this compilation.
 "Why (Must We Fall in Love)" b/w
 "Uptight (Everything's Alright)"

References

External links 
http://www.hip-oselect.com/scr.public.product.asp?product_id=105822A9-4C47-403C-A7A5-8DAD2F781C98

2011 compilation albums
The Supremes compilation albums
Motown compilation albums
Hip-O Records compilation albums